Terribacillus is a Gram-positive and aerobic genus of bacteria from the family of Bacillaceae.

References

Further reading 
 
 

Bacillaceae
Bacteria genera